is a 2022 Japanese hybrid tokusatsu/animated musical dance film based on a television series with a same name created by BN Pictures. The film is directed by Ryuichi Kimura, written by Misuzu Chiba and produced by BN Pictures. The film was released in Japan on July 15, 2022, as a double feature with a 25-minute short, Aikatsu! 10th Story: Starway to the Future.

Synopsis
A few months after the Planet Princess Grand Prix, Mao's schedule is packed. To show her gratitude to her fans, she launches "Aikatsu Planet! Gratitude Festival".

Cast
: 
: 
: 
: 
: 
: 
: 
: 
: 
: 
: 
: 
: 
: 
:

Production
In October 2021, it was announced on Sunrise Festival Regeneration 2021 that Aikatsu Planet! tokusatsu/animated television series will receive a film adaptation, with director Ryuichi Kimura, and screenwriter Misuzu Chiba returning from the television series for the film. In April 2021, the official website revealed that animation character designer Risa Miyadani will return for the film.

Release
The film was released in theaters in Japan on July 15, 2022, as a double feature with 25-minute short, Aikatsu! 10th Story: Starway to the Future.

Reception

Box office
The film failed to make it to the top 10 in the Japanese box office.

References

External links
 

2020s Japanese films
Japanese musical films
Tokusatsu films